Reto Knutti (born 1973) is a Swiss climate scientist and professor of climate physics at ETH Zurich's Institute for Atmospheric and Climate Science. He is known for his research involving climate models, and has been a key member of the Intergovernmental Panel on Climate Change.

References

External links
Faculty page

Swiss climatologists
1973 births
Living people
Academic staff of ETH Zurich
Swiss physicists
Intergovernmental Panel on Climate Change lead authors